Eucephalus ledophyllus is a North American species of flowering plant in the family Asteraceae known by the common name Cascade aster. It is native to Washington, Oregon and northern California in the United States, mostly in the Cascade Mountains. Some of the populations are inside national parks and monuments: Mount Rainier National Park, North Cascades National Park, and Mount St. Helens National Volcanic Monument.

Eucephalus ledophyllus is a perennial herb up to 80 cm (32 inches) tall, with a large woody caudex. One plant will usually produce 3-20 flower heads in a showy array. Each head has 5–21 purple ray florets surrounding numerous yellow  disc florets.

Varieties
Eucephalus ledophyllus var. covillei (Greene) G.L.Nesom - Oregon, California - flower stalks not cottony
Eucephalus ledophyllus var. ledophyllus - Washington, Oregon - flower stalks cottony

References

External links
Oregon Flora Image Project, University of Hawaii, Eucephalus ledophyllus (A. Gray) E. Greene, Cascades aster - native  numerous photos

Astereae
Flora of California
Flora of Oregon
Flora of Washington (state)
Plants described in 1872